Namataiki Tevenino (born 20 June 1996) is a French Polynesian athlete specialising in the sprint hurdles. He represented his country at the 2016 and 2018 World Indoor Championships without advancing from the first round on both occasions.

His personal bests are 15.41 seconds in the 110 metres hurdles (+1.1 m/s, Toulouse 2017) and 8.53 seconds in the 60 metres hurdles (Aubiére 2016).

International competitions

References

1996 births
Living people
French Polynesian male athletes
Male hurdlers